Jay Reynolds may refer to:

 Jay Reynolds (producer), British music producer, songwriter and musician
 Jay Reynolds (sportscaster), American radio sports and news anchor